This was the first edition of the tournament. 

Petra Martić won the title, defeating Mona Barthel in the final, 6–4, 6–1.

Seeds

Draw

Finals

Top half

Bottom half

Qualifying

Seeds

Qualifiers

Qualifying draw

First qualifier

Second qualifier

Third qualifier

Fourth qualifier

Fifth qualifier

Sixth qualifier

External Links
Main Draw
Qualifying Draw

Oracle Challenger Series – Chicago - Singles
Oracle Challenger Series – Chicago